The following lists events that happened during 1973 in South Africa.

Incumbents
 State President: Jim Fouché.
 Prime Minister: John Vorster.
 Chief Justice: Newton Ogilvie Thompson.

Events

January
 8 – Two South African policemen are killed and two injured in an explosion near the Zambezi River in north-western Rhodesia.
 9 – the first strike of the 1973 Durban strikes occurs

February
 1 – Venda and Gazankulu are granted self-government.

March
 Steve Biko is banned by the government.

August
 25 – Harry Schwarz wins the leadership of the United Party in the Transvaal, replacing Marais Steyn.

Unknown date
 The Natal Parks Board starts buying up farms to form the Itala Game Reserve.
 Michael Lapsley, an Anglican priest, arrives in South Africa.
 African and Arab states impose an oil embargo on South Africa.

Births
 22 January – Brandon Silent, football player & coach.
 13 February – Dino Quattrocecere, figure skater.
 1 March – Robert Marawa, sports journalist, sports commentator, television presenter and radio host.
 5 March – Dumisa Ngobe, football player
 8 March – Jill Brukman, backstroke and medley swimmer.
 20 March – Nicky Boje, cricketer.
 15 April – Werner Swanepoel, rugby player.
 10 May – Ollie Le Roux, rugby player.
 31 May – Amanda Taylor, synchronized swimmer.
 16 July – Shaun Pollock, former cricketer & commentator.
 19 July – Nathalie Boltt, actress.
 29 July – AJ Venter, rugby player.
 25 August – Nico Panagio, actor & tv presenter.
 18 September – Mark Shuttleworth, entrepreneur and space tourist.
 29 October – Adam Bacher, cricketer.
 31 October – Cobus Visagie, rugby player.
 18 November – Michele MacNaughton, field hockey player.
 27 November – Sharlto Copley, producer, actor, and director.
 29 November – Raphael Smith, screenwriter and songwriter.
 16 December – Themba Mnguni, football player.

Deaths
 21 February – Cecil Kellaway, actor. (b. 1890)

Railways

Locomotives
Two new Cape gauge and one narrow gauge locomotive types enter service on the South African Railways:
 April – The first of one hundred Class 34-400 General Electric (GE) type U26C diesel-electric locomotives.
 The first of one hundred Class 6E1, Series 4 electric locomotives.
 September–December – Twenty Class 91-000 GE type UM6B narrow gauge diesel-electric locomotives on the Avontuur Railway.

References

South Africa
Years in South Africa
History of South Africa